Jon Larrinaga Muguruza (born 20 November 1990 in Amurrio) is a Spanish cyclist.

Major results
Source:
2013
1st Overall Tour de Gironde
1st Stage 2
1st Stage 2 Troféu Joaquim Agostinho

References

External links
 

1990 births
Living people
Cyclists from the Basque Country (autonomous community)
Sportspeople from Álava
Spanish male cyclists
21st-century Spanish people